Hong Seong-chan (born 30 June 1997) is a South Korean tennis player. Hong has a career high ATP singles ranking of 343 achieved on 24 October 2016.

Hong reached the final of the 2015 Australian Open junior championships, falling to top seed Roman Safiullin in the final. Hong has a career high junior ranking of 3.

Since 2015, Hong has been a member of the South Korean Davis Cup team.

Challenger and Futures/World Tennis Tour Finals

Singles: 20 (15–5)

Doubles (8–2)

Junior Grand Slam finals

Singles: 1 (1 runner-up)

References

External links
 
 

1997 births
Living people
South Korean male tennis players
Sportspeople from Gangwon Province, South Korea
Universiade medalists in tennis
Tennis players at the 2018 Asian Games
Universiade silver medalists for South Korea
Asian Games competitors for South Korea
Medalists at the 2019 Summer Universiade
Medalists at the 2017 Summer Universiade
21st-century South Korean people